is a crossover sports and party game in the Mario & Sonic at the Olympic Games series, released for the Nintendo 3DS in February 2016 in Japan, March 2016 in North America, and in April 2016 for Europe and Australia, and for the Wii U worldwide in June 2016. The game is officially licensed by the International Olympic Committee, as have the other games in the series. It was developed by Sega, with assistance from Arzest and Spike Chunsoft, and published by Nintendo. It is the fifth title in the Mario & Sonic at the Olympic Games series. The game is a collection of Olympic sports themed mini-games featuring characters from the Mario series and the Sonic the Hedgehog series.

The game received generally mixed reviews upon release. A sixth game in the series, Mario & Sonic at the Olympic Games Tokyo 2020, was released in November 2019 for the Nintendo Switch.

Gameplay
The game features forty-two playable characters from Mario and Sonic the Hedgehog franchises, as well as the option to use a previously made Mii character in-game. In the Nintendo 3DS version of the game, Mario, Sonic, and Mii are the only characters that can be used in all events; other returning characters are exclusive to two events while new characters are only playable in one. In the Wii U version of the game, all returning characters from previous games are usable in all events, while new playable characters (known as "guests" in-game) are only playable in one.

The characters new to the series that can be used in both versions of the game include Diddy Kong, Nabbit, Wendy O. Koopa, Larry Koopa, Rosalina, Dry Bowser, Jet the Hawk, Rouge the Bat, Wave the Swallow, Espio the Chameleon, Zavok, Sticks the Badger, and Zazz. In the Wii U version, Toad is featured as an exclusive character. In the 3DS version, Roy Koopa, Ludwig von Koopa, Dry Bones, Birdo, Dr. Eggman Nega, E-123 Omega, and Cream the Rabbit all appear as exclusive characters. Each character has their own individual statistics for 'power', 'speed' and 'technique', which affect the player's performance depending on the variables of the minigame.

Boxing, rugby sevens and football debut in the game alongside refined versions of returning events, such as athletics, volleyball, archery, swimming and equestrian. In the Wii U version, some of the minigames have motion control functionality using the Wii Remote controller.

Each minigame is held in a re-creation of its corresponding venue in the actual 2016 Rio de Janeiro Olympic Games.

Development
The game was first revealed on the Japanese Nintendo Direct website on May 30, 2015. Like the previous games, the game was officially licensed by the International Olympic Committee. Both versions of the game released worldwide in 2016. An arcade edition of the game was also announced by Sega, which was released in Japan in 2016. It was released in North America and Europe on June 24, 2016, alongside the Wii U version.

Reception

On the review aggregator Metacritic, both the 3DS and Wii U versions of the game received "mixed or average" scores of 60 (based on 30 critics) and 65 (based on 26 critics) respectively. The game was criticised for being too similar to past installments of the Mario & Sonic series. Nintendo World Report gave the Wii U version a 7/10, stating "While the limited amount of events are the major downer here, I had fun playing them alone or with friends".

Stuart Andrews of TrustedReviews gave the Wii U version a 7/10, stating, "It’s every bit as shallow and silly as previous titles, taking on a broad range of disciplines without ever really mastering any. Yet, if you’re looking for a fun game to play with the family then it’s one of the most enjoyable I’ve played this year."

Notes

References

External links
Official website (3DS) 
Official website (Wii U)

2016 Summer Olympics
2016 video games
Crossover video games
Mario & Sonic at the Olympic Games
Mario sports games
Arcade video games
Nintendo 3DS eShop games
Nintendo 3DS games
Nintendo Network games
Summer Olympic video games
Sega video games
Spike Chunsoft video games
Video game sequels
Video games set in 2016
Video games set in Brazil
Video games that use Amiibo figurines
Wii U eShop games
Wii U games
Video games scored by Tomoya Ohtani
Video games scored by Jun Senoue
Video games developed in Japan
Arzest games
Multiplayer and single-player video games